Toxonevra is a genus of flutter flies in the family Pallopteridae. There are about eight described species in Toxonevra.

Species
These eight species belong to the genus Toxonevra:
T. alticola Ozerov, 1994 c g
T. carterosoma Ozerov, 1993 c g
T. jucunda (Loew, 1863) c g b
T. muliebris (Harris, 1780)
T. paralia Ozerov, 1993 c g
T. similis (Johnson, 1910) c g
T. striata Merz & Sueyoshi, 2002 c g
T. superba (Loew, 1861) c g b
Data sources: i = ITIS, c = Catalogue of Life, g = GBIF, b = Bugguide.net

References

Further reading

External links

 
 

Pallopteridae
Taxa named by Pierre-Justin-Marie Macquart